The Wheat Sifters (Les Cribleuses de Blé) is an oil on canvas painting by Gustave Courbet, created in 1854.

It was exhibited at the Salon of 1855 in Paris, then in 1861 at the ninth exhibition of the Society of Friends of the Art of Nantes, which then bought the painting for the Musée des Beaux-Arts de Nantes.

The young women in the painting are probably the two sisters of Courbet: Zoe (in the center) and Juliet (seated). The boy could be Désiré Binet, the illegitimate son of the painter.

References

1854 paintings
Paintings by Gustave Courbet
Paintings in the collection of the Musée d'Arts de Nantes